West Slavic may refer to:

 West Slavic languages, one of three branches of the Slavic languages
 West Slavs, a subgroup of Slavic peoples who speak the West Slavic languages

Language and nationality disambiguation pages